Grapevine moth or Grape moth may refer to:

 Geina periscelidactyla (the grape plume moth), a moth found in eastern North America
 Lobesia botrana (the European grapevine moth), a tortrix moth
 Nokona regalis (the Japanese grapevine moth), a moth found in Japan
 Phalaenoides glycinae (the Australian grapevine moth), a noctuid moth
 Paralobesia viteana (the grape berry moth), a moth found in Eastern North America and western Colorado
 Oxyptilus regulus (the grape boring plume moth), a moth found in Australia
 Vitacea scepsiformis (the lesser grape root borer moth), a moth found in North America

See also 
 Eupoecilia ambiguella, the vine moth, a moth found in Europe and Asia

Animal common name disambiguation pages